Sandrinho may refer to:
Sandrinho (footballer, born 1980), Brazilian footballer who plays as an attacking midfielder
Sandrinho (footballer, born 1981), Brazilian footballer who played as a defender or midfielder
Sandrinho (footballer, born 1992), Brazilian footballer who plays as a forward or winger